Zhao Tongshan (13 July 1901 – 1966), also known by his stage name Furong Cao, was a Peking opera singer. He was the greatest player of "flowery" female roles (hua dan) of his era and served as a mentor to Li Yuru.


References

Citations

Bibliography
 .

20th-century Chinese male singers
1901 births
1966 deaths
Chinese male Peking opera actors
Singers from Tianjin
Male actors from Tianjin
20th-century Chinese male actors
Female impersonators in Peking opera